This is a timeline of the history of the former British television broadcaster ATV. It provided the ITV service for London at weekends and the Midlands on weekdays from 1955 to 1968, and for the Midlands all week from 1968 to 1982.

1950s
 1954
 26 October – The Independent Television Authority (ITA) awards franchises for the weekend service in London and the weekday service in the Midlands to the Associated Broadcasting Development Company (ABDC).
 1955
25 May – After ABDC has merged with the Incorporated Television Programme Company to form the Associated Broadcasting Company (ABC), the two franchise licences are issued to ABC.
24 September – Two days after the launch of ITV, the Associated Broadcasting Company launches its weekend service for the London area.
 8 October – After legal action from the Associated British Picture Corporation (ABPC), who already use the ABC brand for their cinemas and wish to use it for their television service, the Associated Broadcasting Company is renamed "Associated TeleVision" (ATV).
 1956
17 February – ATV launches its Midlands service, operating on weekdays with ABPC's ABC providing the weekend programmes. ATV's London service is renamed ATV London.
7 May – The first broadcast of ATV Midlands News takes place. It is a short daily summary of regional news with stories often sourced directly from the Birmingham Evening Dispatch, a local newspaper. Film footage is later added with footage shot by Birmingham Commercial Films.
 1957
 No events.
 1958
 ATV Midlands News is supplemented by the launch of Midland Montage, a weekly topical magazine programme.
 ATV purchases the Elstree Studios. The original reason for the purchase was for production of the affiliated ITC filmed series.
 1959
 ATV sets up its own news film unit for its regional news programmes.
 ATV's logo is changed slightly.

1960s
 1960
 Because its existing television studios at other sites were deemed to be insufficient for its requirements, ATV converts its Elstree Studios from film studios into television studios.
 1961
 No events.
 1962
 No events.
 1963
 No events.
 1964
A slight change is made to the logo to add either region's name below the ident.
Early in 1964, ATV's weekday lunchtime entertainment programme, Lunchbox, ends. It had been on air since shortly after ATV had begun broadcasting. Consequently, ATV no longer broadcasts programming at lunchtime.
September – ATV launches its own listings magazine TV World. Previously, listings for the week ahead had been published in a Midlands version of TVTimes. 
5 October – Following pressure from the Independent Television Authority to improve regional coverage, ATV introduces a nightly news magazine programme, ATV Today. It runs for 20 minutes and follows the teatime 15 minute-long ATV Midlands News bulletin. Later ATV Today is later expanded to the full 30 minutes and the news bulletin is subsumed into the main programme.
2 November – The first edition of ATV's soap opera Crossroads is broadcast. The programme continues to be produced by Central after it takes over from ATV in 1982, eventually ending in 1988. It would be revived in 2001 and would end again in 2003. 
 ATV is given a three-year extension to its licence. This is later extended by a further year.
 1965
 No events.
 1966
 Following a restructure of the company, ATV and Incorporated Television Programme Company (ITC) both become subsidiaries of the Associated Communications Corporation (ACC).
 1967
 No events.
 1968
 28 July – ATV stops broadcasting in London after its franchise is given to London Weekend Television. However the company is now able to broadcast seven days a week across the Midlands. The company is renamed ATV Limited.
 2 August – A technicians strike forces ITV off the air for several weeks although management manage to launch a temporary ITV Emergency National Service with no regional variations.
 14 September – The final edition of ATV's listings magazine TV World is published due to TVTimes launching as a national publication the following week.
 1969
 15 November — To coincide with the launch of colour broadcasting, ATV's logo is altered and the famous ‘zoom’ ident launches in glorious technicolor.
 ATV Midlands News is renamed ATV News.

1970s 
 1970
 June – Transmissions across the southern part of ATV's region are improved when ATV begins broadcasting from the Oxford transmitting station.
 1971
 No events.
 1972
 16 October – Following a law change which removed all restrictions on broadcasting hours, ATV launches an afternoon service.
 1973
 No events.
1974
 The 1974 franchise round sees no changes in ITV's contractors as the huge cost in switching to colour television would have made the companies unable to compete against rivals in a franchise battle.
1975 to 1978
 No events, although the late 1970s sees the introduction of short news bulletins at lunchtime and late at night. They are called ATV Newsdesk.
 1979
 10 August – The ten week ITV strike forces ATV off the air. The strike ends on 24 October.

1980s 
 1980
 The Independent Broadcasting Authority announces that the lack of regional programming and production (it had a major studio centre at Elstree in Hertfordshire, a legacy of its London contract), was hampering the region, so it insists that the new applicant for the franchise to be more clearly based in the region and have separate facilities for the East and West Midlands. ACC creates ATV Midlands Limited, a shell company solely for the franchise process. 
28 December – ACC is awarded the Midlands contract but with conditions attached. ACC is forced to sell 49% of the company, relinquish executive roles, sell the Elstree studios and rename the company to demonstrate that it is effectively a new business.
 1981
 Central Independent Television is chosen as the name of the new Midlands franchise.
 1982
 1 January – At 12:34am, the ATV name is used for the final time at closedown of the evening's programmes as when transmissions resume at 9:25am, Central officially goes on the air.
 May – ACC sells its remaining stake in Central, thereby ending Associated Television's involvement with ITV.
 1983
 July – Central uses ATV's studio complex at Elstree for the final time. It does so in order to comply with a condition of the licence renewal which requires the company to stop using any London-centric facilities.
 1984
 The Elstree Studios complex is sold to the BBC.

See also 
 History of ITV
 History of ITV television idents
 Timeline of ITV
 Timeline of ABC Weekend TV – ATV's weekend predecessor in the Midlands
 Timeline of Central Independent Television – ATV's successor in the Midlands
 Timeline of London Weekend Television – ATV London's successor

References

ATV
ATV